Lyijy is the sixth and final studio album by Finnish gothic metal band Poisonblack. The title of the album means lead in English.

Track listing 

 Home Is Where the Sty Is – 3:35
 Down the Ashes Rain – 3:53
 The Flavor of the Month – 3:57
 The Absentee – 4:46
 Maybe Life Is Not for Everyone – 5:32
 Death by the Blues – 3:41
 The Halfway Bar – 5:38
 Them Walls – 4:12
 Blackholehead – 3:39
 Pull the Trigger – 5:23
 Elämän kevät – 6:07
 How Low Can You Go – 2:53 (bonus track for Japan)

Personnel

Poisonblack 
 Ville Laihiala – guitar, vocals
 Tarmo Kanerva – drums
 Antti Remes – bass
 Marco Sneck – keyboards

External links 
http://www.poisonblack.com/site/bio

2013 albums
Poisonblack albums